The Veyle is a  long river in the Ain department in eastern France. Its source is in Chalamont. It flows generally northwest. It is a left tributary of the Saône, into which it flows between Grièges and Crottet, near Mâcon.

Communes along its course
This list is ordered from source to mouth: 
 Chalamont, Châtenay, Dompierre-sur-Veyle, Lent, Servas, Saint-André-sur-Vieux-Jonc, Péronnas, Saint-Rémy, Saint-Denis-lès-Bourg, Buellas, Polliat, Mézériat, Vonnas, Saint-Julien-sur-Veyle, Biziat, Perrex, Saint-Jean-sur-Veyle, Pont-de-Veyle, Crottet, Grièges

References

Rivers of France
Rivers of Auvergne-Rhône-Alpes
Rivers of Ain